Almondo Sewell  (born January 16, 1987) is a professional gridiron football defensive tackle for the Montreal Alouettes of the Canadian Football League (CFL). He played college football at the University of Akron and attended Hargrave Military Academy before transferring to Trenton Central High School in Trenton, New Jersey. He has also been a member of the Edmonton Eskimos and Cleveland Gladiators of the Arena Football League (AFL).

Professional career

Edmonton Eskimos
Sewell signed with the Edmonton Eskimos on May 27, 2011. He started the season on the reserve list and appeared in three games before being released on August 2, 2011.

Cleveland Gladiators
Almondo Sewell spent part of the 2012 season with the Cleveland Gladiators of the Arena Football League (AFL).

Edmonton Eskimos (II)
Sewell was signed by the Edmonton Eskimos on June 4, 2012. He signed a contract extension on December 19, 2013. Almondo Sewell established himself as one of the league's top defensive linemen: He was named a CFL All-Star in five consecutive seasons (2013-2017) and a CFL West All-Star in six consecutive seasons (2012-2017). Sewell received multiple contract extensions while with the Eskimos, re-signing on December 19, 2013, December 22, 2015 and October 12, 2018. On February 2, 2021, at age 34, Sewell posted on Twitter that he would not be re-signing with Edmonton, and would become a free agent on February 9. Through his nine years with Edmonton, Sewell amassed 282 tackles and 60 sacks in 139 regular season games, and was named a CFL All-Star six times, and divisional All-Star seven times.

Montreal Alouettes
On February 9, 2021, it was announced that Sewell had signed with the Montreal Alouettes. He played in all 14 regular season games where he had 19 defensive tackles and five sacks.

Personal life
He has a pet rabbit named Dusko. Sewell plans to join the Edmonton Police Service after his football career is over.

References

External links
Montreal Alouettes bio
Just Sports Stats
College stats
Akron Zips bio

1987 births
Living people
African-American players of American football
African-American players of Canadian football
Akron Zips football players
American football defensive tackles
Canadian football defensive linemen
Cleveland Gladiators players
Edmonton Elks players
Green Bay Blizzard players
Jamaican players of American football
Jamaican players of Canadian football
Montreal Alouettes players
People from Portland Parish
Players of American football from Trenton, New Jersey
Trenton Central High School alumni
21st-century African-American sportspeople
20th-century African-American people